The Paddock Wood Half Marathon is an annual road running event held in Paddock Wood, Kent, United Kingdom. It was first run in 1989 and 
has taken place every year except 2001 when the race was canceled due to the UK outbreak of Foot-and-mouth disease.  The 2020 edition of the race was originally due to talk place on Sunday 6 April, due to the Covid-19 Pandemic, the decision was taken to postpone the event in March, with Sunday 6 September 2020 as the rescheduled date.  The race is organised by Paddock Wood AC.

Past winners

References

External links
 

Half marathons in the United Kingdom
Recurring sporting events established in 1990
1990 establishments in England
Sport in Kent
Paddock Wood